Jinošice is a village and administrative part of Bystřice in Benešov District in the Central Bohemian Region of the Czech Republic. It has about 50 inhabitants.

References

Populated places in Benešov District